Bricklayers and Masons F.C., also known as Chicago Bricklayers, was a U.S. soccer team based in Chicago, Illinois which joined that city's Association Football League in 1914.  Over the next twenty years, Bricklayers won two Peel Cups and was the runner up in the 1928 and 1931 National Challenge Cup.

History
In 1914, Bricklayers joined the Association Football League of Chicago.  According to Dave Litterer, “the ALFC  welcomed one of the major regional powers to its ranks - the Bricklayers”.  At some point, Bricklayers jumped to the Illinois State Football Association League, winning the 1917-1918 championship. In 1920, Bricklayers was in the Chicago and District Soccer League, better known as the Chicago Soccer League. Bricklayers won the 1921 CSL championship. In the late 1920s and early 1930s, Bricklayers competed in the Chicago Building Trades League.  The team continued to compete until 1947 when it folded.

Year-by-year

Honors
National Challenge Cup
 Runner Up (2): 1928, 1931

Peel Cup
 Winner (2):  1920, 1924
 Runner Up (2): 1918, 1921

League Championship
 Winner (2): 1918, 1921
 Runner Up (1): 1915

References

External links
 Encyclopedia of Chicago: Soccer
 Chicago Soccer History

Defunct soccer clubs in Illinois
Soccer clubs in Chicago
1947 disestablishments in Illinois
Association football clubs disestablished in 1947